RTS may refer to:

Medicine
 Rape trauma syndrome, the psychological trauma experienced by a rape victim
 Revised Trauma Score, a system to evaluate injuries secondary to violent trauma
 Rubinstein–Taybi syndrome, a condition characterized by short stature, etc.

Radio and television
 Royal Television Society, a UK-based society for the discussion of television
 Radio-televizija Srbije, the national broadcasting company of Serbia
 Radiodiffusion Télévision Sénégalaise, the Senegalese national broadcasting company
 Radiotelevizija Slovenija, the national broadcaster of Slovenia
 Radio Télévision Suisse, the French-speaking public broadcasting company of Switzerland
 Rozhlas a televízia Slovenska, the national broadcasting company of Slovakia
 Radio & Television of Singapore, Mediacorp's name from 1963 till 1980
 RedTeleSistema, a private television station in Ecuador
 SES/RTS, the callsign of a TV station in Loxton, South Australia

Technology
 Return statement, mnemonic in some computer languages (ReTurn from Subroutine)
 Radio teleswitch service, which regulates energy rates via broadcast radio in the UK
 Request to Send (disambiguation), control signals
 Runtime system, an implementation for executing software
 Real-time strategy, a video gaming genre

Transportation
 Rapid Transit Series, transit buses originally manufactured by General Motors Corporation
 Regional Transit Service, a division of the Rochester-Genesee Regional Transportation Authority
 Gainesville Regional Transit System, the local area transit corporation in Gainesville, Alachua County, Florida, US
 Johor Bahru–Singapore Rapid Transit System, a cross border metro between Singapore and Malaysia
 Rottnest Island Airport, Australia, IATA code RTS

Organizations
 Russian Trading System, a stock exchange in Russia
 Reclaim the Streets, an organization
 Reformed Theological Seminary, a theological seminary in the US
 Religious Tract Society, 19th century religious publisher

Other uses
 The Regulatory Technical Standard mandated by the EU's revised Payment Services Directive (PSD2)
 Return to sender (disambiguation)
 Ronald Reagan Ballistic Missile Defense Test Site, also known as the "Reagan Test Site"